Parliamentary elections were held in Greece on 10 October 1993. PASOK of Andreas Papandreou, was elected with 170 of the 300 seats, defeating the conservative New Democracy party of Constantine Mitsotakis.

Results

Notes

References

Parliamentary elections in Greece
1990s in Greek politics
Greece
Legislative
Greece